Emamzadeh Ali may refer to:
 Emamzadeh Ali, Fars
 Emamzadeh Ali (Emamzadeh Ali Farim), Mazandaran Province
 Emamzadeh Ali (Emamzadeh Ali-ye Shelimak), Mazandaran Province
 Emamzadeh Ali, South Khorasan

See also
 Emamzadeh Ali Akbar (disambiguation)